Coussareeae is a tribe of flowering plants in the family Rubiaceae and contains 407 species in 10 genera. The former tribe Coccocypseleae Bremek., consisting of Coccocypselum, Declieuxia, and Hindsia, is considered part of Coussareeae. Its representatives are found in Central and South America.

Genera 
Currently accepted names
 Bradea Standl. (6 sp)
 Coccocypselum P.Browne (22 sp)
 Coussarea Aubl. (120 sp)
 Cruckshanksia Hook. & Arn. (7 sp)
 Declieuxia Kunth (29 sp)
 Faramea Aubl. (204 sp)
 Heterophyllaea Hook.f. (2 sp)
 Hindsia Benth. ex Lindl. (11 sp)
 Oreopolus Schltdl. (1 sp)
 Standleya Brade (6 sp)

Synonyms

 Antoniana Tussac = Faramea
 Bellardia Schreb. = Coccocypselum
 Billardiera Vahl = Coussarea
 Cococipsilum J.St.-Hil. = Coccocypselum
 Condalia Ruiz & Pav. = Coccocypselum
 Congdonia Jeps. = Declieuxia
 Darluca Raf. = Faramea
 Encopea C.Presl = Faramea
 Evea Aubl. = Faramea
 Froelichia Vahl = Coussarea
 Homaloclados Hook.f. = Faramea
 Lecanosperma Rusby = Heterophyllaea
 Lipostoma D.Don = Coccocypselum
 Macrosiphon Miq. = Hindsia
 Neleixa Raf. = Faramea
 Pecheya Scop. = Coussarea
 Peckeya Raf. = Coussarea
 Potima R.Hedw. = Faramea
 Rotheria Meyen = Cruckshanksia
 Sicelium P.Browne = Coccocypselum
 Sulzeria Roem. & Schult. = Faramea
 Tetramerium C.F.Gaertn. = Faramea
 Thiersia Baill. = Faramea
 Tontanea Aubl. = Coccocypselum

References 

Rubioideae tribes